In Carnatic music, Neraval also known as  Niraval or Sahitya Vinyasa is the elaboration and improvisation of melody for a particular line. Usually, just one or two lines of text from the song (from the charanam part of the kriti) are sung repeatedly, but with improvised elaborations. This elaboration remains within the framework of the original patterns of duration (talam), and each word in the lines of text stay set within their original place (idam) in the tala cycle. The lines are then also played at different levels of speed which can include double speed, triple speed, quadruple speed and even sextuple speed. The neraval is one of the features in the extempore improvisation aspect (Manodharma Sangita) of Carnatic music, and is intended to highlight the Raga bhava effectively. It is usually performed by the more advanced performers.

Examples 

Examples of Krithis containing lines best suited for neraval:

Vathapi Ganapathim in Hamsadhwani at "Pranava Swarupa Vakratundam"
 Balagopala in Bhairavi at "Neela neeradha shareera dheerathara",
Entara Nithana in Harikambhoji at "Sheshudu Shivuniki Bushudu Lakshmana",
Nidhichaala Sukhama in Kalyani (raga) at "Mamathabandhanayutha Narasthuthi Sukhama?" or "Sumathi Thyagaraja Keerthana Sukhama?"
O Rangasayee in Kambhoji at "Bhuloka Vaikuntam ithiyani",
Ennaganu Ramabhajana in Kamavardhini at "Rama Chiluka Nokata Penchi Prema Matalalada Nerpi",
Raghuvara Nannu in Kamavardhini at "Manasuna Niki"
Pakkala Nilabadi in Kharaharapriya at " Tanuvurce vandana mona ninchuchu nara" or "Manasuna"
Palinchu Kamakshi in Madhyamavati at "Kanthamagu Peru Pondhithivi Kaarunyamurthivai jagamu",
Rama Rama Gunaseema in Simhendramadhyamam at "Munimaanasa dhama Mrughamatha Sulalama",
Rama nee Samanamevaru in Kharaharapriya at "Paluku palukulaku tene"
Saroja Dhala Netri in Sankarabharanam at "Sama Gana Vinodhini gunadhama Shyamakrishnanuthe",
Shambho Mahadeva in Kamavardhini at "Shambho Mahadeva Sharanagathajana rakshaka",
Jagadoddharana in Kapi at "Purandara Vithalana"
 Narayana Ninna Namada in Shuddha Dhanyasi at "Ento Purandaravithalarayana"
 Sri Venkateshwara'' in Thodi at "Maarajanakam Madhavanamakam",

Notes

References 
 
 Viswanathan, T. & Cormack, Jody (1998). In

See also 
 Glossary of Carnatic music

Carnatic music
Carnatic music terminology